Altman is a surname. Notable people with the surname include:

Benjamin Altman (1840–1913), American retailer, founder of B. Altman & Co. and art collector
David R. Altman (1915–2000), American advertising executive
Dennis Altman (born 1943), Australian academic and pioneering gay rights activist
Doug Altman (1948–2018), English statistician
Edith Altman (born 1931), German-American artist
Edward I. Altman, (born 1941), American professor of finance, creator of Altman Z-score bankruptcy prediction model
Georges Altman (born 1901), French journalist and resistance fighter
Howard Altman (born 1960), American journalist
Ida Altman (born 1950), American historian
Jeff Altman (born 1951), American comedian
John Altman (disambiguation), several people
Joseph Altman (1925–2016), American neuroscientist and biologist who discovered adult neurogenesis in the 1960s
Koby Altman (born 1982/1983), American basketball executive
Kyle Altman (born 1986), American soccer player
Mark A. Altman, writer, producer and actor
Mike Altman (born 1975), American rower
Mike Altman (lyricist) (born 1955), American songwriter
Mitch Altman (born 1956), American hacker and inventor
Moyshe Altman (1890–1981), Russian Yiddish writer
Naomi Altman, Canadian-American statistician
Nathan Altman (1889–1970), Russian painter
Phyllis Altman (1919–1999), South African trade unionist and anti-apartheid activist
Ray H. Altman (born 1943), American politician from Kentucky
Roger Altman (born 1946), founder of Evercore Partners and former U.S. Deputy treasury secretary
Robert Altman (1925–2006), American film director
Robert A. Altman (born 1947), American lawyer involved in Bank of Credit and Commerce International scandal
Sam Altman (born 1985), American entrepreneur, investor, programmer; president of Y Combinator
Scott Altman (born 1959), American astronaut
Sean Altman (born 1961), American musician and songwriter (Rockapella)
Semen Altman (born 1946),  Ukrainian football coach
Sidney Altman (1939–2022), Canadian biologist
Stuart Altman (born 1937), American Health-care economist
Tosia Altman (1918–1943), Polish Jewish resistance fighter

See also

Altmann (surname)

English-language surnames
Surnames from nicknames